Aadheys is a 2014 Maldivian family drama film directed by Abdul Faththaah. Written and produced by Hassan Ali under Dash Studio, the film stars Niuma Mohamed, Hussain Sobah, Amira Ismail, Moosa Zakariyya and Fathimath Azifa in pivotal roles. The film was released on 1 October 2014. Filming took place in R. Ungoofaaru simultaneously with director's romantic film Love Story (2012). Filming was completed on 6 September 2011 and spent 25 days for shooting.

Cast 
 Niuma Mohamed as Nifasha
 Hussain Sobah as Ahmed
 Amira Ismail as Zulfa
 Moosa Zakariyya
 Fathimath Azifa as Niha
 Ali Azim as Fahud
 Mariyam Shakeela

Soundtrack

Release and reception
Initially the crew planned to release the film during December 2011. It was later pushed to a 2012 release before finalising the date to 1 October 2014 following the death of writer and producer Hassain Ali. A total of seventeen shows were screened at Olympus Cinema. Upon release, the film received mixed reviews from critics and failed to leave an impression commercially. Ismail Naail reviewing from Vaguthu wrote: "The film focuses on family issue, identity issue and includes romantic components and several other aspects making it a mixed bag of emotions. It has several issues in the technical department though its melodrama might leave an impact on audience. Those who fond art films will be very much disappointed with this project".

Accolades

References

2014 films
2014 drama films
Maldivian drama films
Films directed by Abdul Faththaah
Dhivehi-language films